The RPG-27 is a Soviet single shot disposable grenade launcher. It entered service with the Soviet Army in 1989.

History
The RPG-27 Tavolga ('meadow grass') was developed by the State Research and Production Enterprise, Bazalt, as a modern anti-tank grenade launcher designed to defeat modern and future tanks with advanced reactive and composite armor as well as fortified infantry. The RPG-27 was developed by the Soviet Union from the RPG-26.

Description
The RPG-27 shares a close resemblance with the previous RPG-26 in that it is a man-portable, disposable anti-tank grenade launcher with a single shot capacity. The RPG-27 has a larger diameter round than the RPG-26 which enables the RPG-27 to achieve higher armour penetration performance. The RPG-27 fin stabilised round is a 105 mm tandem-charge HEAT warhead with a range of 200 meters. The round has a stated penetration capability in excess of 650 mm of RHA (after ERA) and 1500 mm of brick or concrete and 3700 mm of earth.

Variants

RShG-1 
The RShG-1 (Реактивная Штурмовая Граната, Reaktivnaya Shturmovaya Granata, Rocket-propelled Assault Grenade) Tavolga-1 (Таволга-1) is a variant of RPG-27 with thermobaric warhead. It is intended to be used against soft skinned and lightly armored vehicles, buildings, military installations and infantry. The RShG-1 is very similar in operation to the RPG-27. It has a lethal radius of 10 meters and a larger sighting range of 600 meters. The warhead contains 1.9 kilograms (4.19 pounds) of thermobaric mixture, with an explosive yield roughly equal to that of 8 kilograms (17.6 pounds) of TNT. Officially adopted by the Russian Government in December 2011.

RMG 
RMG is a smaller, multipurpose variant of the RShG-1 that is optimized for the bunker buster role and defeating light vehicles and infantry in cover. As a result, its penetration performance against tank armor is reduced.

The launcher carries a tandem warhead. The precursor high-explosive anti-tank (HEAT) warhead penetrates armour or other obstacles (reinforced concrete, masonry, etc.). The aerosol produced by the main thermobaric warhead enters the target through the opening created by the precursor charge and combusts, producing high-explosive and incendiary effects.

The RMG (Reaktivnaya Mnogotselevaya Granata or "rocket-propelled multi-purpose grenade") rocket launcher was developed by Bazalt in the early 2000s. The launcher and round share the same designation, as is standard for disposable rocket launchers. S. Kh. Irtuganov was the lead designer for the project. It was officially adopted by the Russian Government in December 2011.

Operators

Current operators

Former operators

References

External links

Rosaboronexport Catalogue

Anti-tank rockets
Modern anti-tank rockets of Russia
Cold War anti-tank rockets of the Soviet Union
Rocket-propelled grenade launchers
Bazalt products
Modern thermobaric weapons of Russia
Military equipment introduced in the 1980s